Slavia is an unincorporated community in Seminole County, Florida, United States. Slavia is located along State Road 426 near the southwest border of Oviedo.

History
In 1911, Lutheran Slovaks originally from what at the time was the Austro-Hungarian Empire (now Slovakia) who were living in Cleveland, Ohio formed the Slavia Colony Company with the goal of establishing a colony in Florida.

Notable Places
Only a few places exist in this small area.  Lukas Nursery and Butterfly Encounter and St. Lukes Lutheran Church and school lie within the boundaries, both sharing the Slovak history that Slavia is known for.

References

Unincorporated communities in Seminole County, Florida
Slovak-American history
Unincorporated communities in Florida